Europe is the cradle of the geoparks movement. The European Geoparks Network is a founding member of the Global Geoparks Network and it functions as a regional geopark network of it. As of November 2022, there are 94 UNESCO Global Geoparks in 28 European countries and there are several territories in an aspiring or planned phase, or in a national geopark status. Further elements of the geodiversity of the continent is represented on the World Heritage list, under criterion VIII or VII.

UNESCO Global Geoparks 

Note *Kula Volcanic Geopark was enlarged and renamed as Kula Salihli Geopark in 2020. Though it is in the Asian part of Turkey, it is included here as the European Geopark Network extends across all of Turkey.

Recognition of Europe's geodiversity under different international frameworks

World Heritage sites 
Twenty-eight sites are represented currently on the World Heritage list under criterion VIII, as an outstanding representative of Earth's history:

 Pirin National Park (Bulgaria)
 Plitvice Lakes National Park (Croatia)
 Ilulissat Icefjord (Greenland, Denmark)
 Wadden Sea (Denmark, Germany, Netherlands)
 Stevns Klint (Denmark)
 High Coast / Kvarken Archipelago (Finland, Sweden)
 Gulf of Porto: Calanche of Piana, Gulf of Girolata, Scandola Reserve (France)
 Pyrénées - Mont Perdu (France, Spain)
 Chaîne des Puys - Limagne fault tectonic arena (France)
 Messel Pit Fossil Site (Germany)
 Caves of Aggtelek Karst and Slovak Karst (Hungary, Slovakia)
 Vatnajökull National Park - Dynamic Nature of Fire and Ice (Iceland)
 Isole Eolie (Aeolian Islands) (Italy)
 Monte San Giorgio (Italy, Switzerland)
 The Dolomites (Italy)
 Mount Etna (Italy)
 Durmitor National Park (Montenegro)
 West Norwegian Fjords – Geirangerfjord and Nærøyfjord (Norway)
 Lake Baikal (Russia)
 Volcanoes of Kamchatka (Russia)
 Lena Pillars Nature Park (Russia)
 Škocjan Caves (Slovenia)
 Teide National Park (Spain)
 Laponian Area (Sweden)
 Swiss Alps Jungfrau-Aletsch (Switzerland)
 Swiss Tectonic Arena Sardona (Switzerland)
 Giant's Causeway and Causeway Coast (United Kingdom)
 Dorset and East Devon Coast (United Kingdom)

Further sites are inscribed under criterion VII of superlative natural phenomena and aesthetic importance. Some of them, which have a special geoheritage importance are:

 Natural and Cultural Heritage of the Ohrid region (Albania, North Macedonia)
 Lagoons of New Caledonia: Reef Diversity and Associated Ecosystems (France)
 Pitons, cirques and remparts of Reunion Island (France)
 French Austral Lands and Seas (France)
 Meteora (Greece)
 Mount Athos (Greece)
 Danube Delta (Romania)
 Putorana Plateau (Russia)
 Göreme National Park and the Rock Sites of Cappadocia (Turkey)
 Hierapolis-Pamukkale (Turkey)
 St Kilda (United Kingdom)
 Gough and Inaccessible Islands (United Kingdom)

Notes

References

External links 
 European Geoparks Network (accessed 29 January 2020)

Geoparks in Europe
Lists of UNESCO Global Geoparks